Lycurgus is a Dutch professional men's volleyball club based in Groningen. They currently compete in the top flight of Dutch volleyball, Eredivisie.

History
Abiant Lycurgus had relative success through the 1970s and 1980s, but the club never won any championships. It reached the national final in 2011/12 and 2014/15, but lost both matches, before finally winning the Dutch championship and Dutch cup in the 2015/16 season.

Honours
 Dutch Championship
Winners (3): 2015–16, 2016–17, 2017–18

 Dutch Cup
Winners (4): 2015–16, 2019–20, 2020–21, 2021–22

 Dutch SuperCup
Winners (5): 2015–16, 2016–17, 2017–18, 2018–19, 2020–21

References

External links
 Official website 
 Team profile at Volleybox.net

Dutch volleyball clubs
Volleyball clubs established in 1952
1952 establishments in the Netherlands